Benn Lee Jordan (born October 28, 1979) is an American musician operating under many pseudonyms. Since 1999, his most widely distributed electronic music has been released under the name of The Flashbulb. Other names Jordan has released as are Acidwolf, Human Action Network, and FlexE.

Biography 
Jordan was born in 1979 and raised in West Englewood, Chicago, by his mother and grandparents. An only child growing up in a derelict neighborhood, Jordan became an accomplished self-taught guitarist as a child. Due to being left-handed and not having lessons, he learned to play a right-handed guitar upside down, which he continues to do. He began his music career releasing instrumental music on small labels in the United States and Europe in 1996 under various aliases, most notably The Flashbulb. In addition to releasing music and touring, he began to work as a freelance composer for various television and film agencies.

Musical style 

As The Flashbulb, Jordan typically releases electronic or cinematic styled music. His style differs strongly between albums, but they all have a cohesive bond tied around intricate drum programming, jazz-influenced melodies, and a wide array of live instrumentation from various instruments Jordan has acquired. He also often records his melodies through MIDI-synced guitars. His guitar style and skill have gained attention because he typically plays the guitar strung backwards, and makes heavy use of fast sweeping and tapping. More recent Flashbulb albums have featured violinist Greg Hirte, who is also featured heavily on The Flashbulb's 2008 album, Soundtrack to a Vacant Life. This album is, as Jordan stated in a 2008 interview, a step away from the breakcore genre. He also said that this step is likely to be a permanent trend in the direction of his music, a move that was supported by releases under his own name, such as Pale Blue Dot and Louisiana Mourning. However, the 2012 album Hardscrabble represents a return to the harder electronic music heard on releases like Kirlian Selections or Flexing Habitual. The record is named for an area in the Bridgeport neighborhood of Jordan's own Chicago.

Under other aliases, Benn Jordan's work varies quite a bit. His Acidwolf and Human Action Network aliases feature retro acid music that uses old drum machines such as the TR-808 and relies heavily on the melodies of the TB-303. Tracks made under the FlexE alias tend to be laid-back and classic acid. According to him, he showcases his more fundamental, classical, and personal pieces under his own name, Benn Jordan.

Composing for television and film 

Jordan has seen much success in composing for television and film. In 2006 he composed the original score for the Josh C. Waller short The Nail.

In 2006, Jordan's music ("Passage D" from his album Kirlian Selections) was featured in Dove's "Evolution" promotional campaign for its Campaign for Real Beauty website, which has drawn a large amount of attention from the mainstream media. The campaign took the commercial film winner at Cannes, as well as many other prestigious awards. In addition, Jordan was nominated for a 2007 London International Award for the "Best Use Of Music" category; he went on to win the ceremony's grand prize. In 2008, he was nominated again at the London International Awards for "Best Use of Music," although he did not take the grand prize. In 2008 he was also a Webby Award nominee and took the Grand Prix at the Cannes Film Festival. In 2008, Jordan had completed work in branding, having created stings and trademark sounds for companies such as Dove, Verizon, and others.

In July 2012, he released an original score entitled The Universe, which was commissioned by Chicago's Adler Planetarium for a new interactive exhibit dedicated to the evolution of the universe. In 2013, he was commissioned to score their show entitled "Cosmic Wonder". In 2016 he composed the soundtrack to the Adler Planetarium's sky show Planet Nine.

Jordan currently composes for film, television, and gaming through various agencies; he also currently owns and operates his own production and recording facilities in Smyrna, Georgia.

Alphabasic and music piracy 

After the collapse of Sublight Records, instead of taking on another contract, Jordan purchased his previous licenses and released his most anticipated album, Soundtrack to a Vacant Life, on his own record label, Alphabasic Records. On the day of its release, he personally uploaded copies of the album to music piracy sites, including a small HTML file explaining his relaxed views on file sharing and showing listeners where they could give support if they desired. This resulted in attention by the mainstream press, and the album became the most downloaded album on many popular file sharing networks.

Jordan has spoken extensively on issues of net neutrality, free speech, and copyright laws in the music world. In an interview with TorrentFreak, he encourages involvement in these issues and warns against corporations like Amazon or iTunes and their ability to stem the free flow of information. File sharing, to Jordan, is a way of bypassing this potential oppression and accessing information freely. In the aforementioned interview, Jordan notes that "file trading is just a peephole to a much larger picture. Copyright, in its current state, holds information at ransom for monetary value. While in music it can stifle culture and art, with literature and education it can be nothing less than a weapon of class warfare."

Philanthropy 

Benn Jordan was the founder and president of 32 Forty, a non-profit music education center located in south Chicago. The music center (now closed), extended services to help independent recording artists with publishing and licensing. In 2011, Jordan released a large collection of unreleased music, titled "Old Trees (1999–2011)" with all proceeds going to Unicef. Jordan is also an ambassador for Unearthed Pictures, a foundation dedicated to publicizing and stopping the sexual exploitation of children and funding safe houses in North America, Africa, and Asia.

Personal life 
In 2014, Jordan left Chicago and moved his home studio to an isolated home in Smyrna, Georgia. He trains and competes in mixed martial arts and Brazilian Jiu Jitsu in his spare time.

YouTube 
Jordan has a self-titled YouTube channel (previously titled Benn and Gear). On his channel, he creates educational videos relating to music making. In 2020, Jordan was formally threatened with legal action after posting a video about LRADs.

Discography

As The Flashbulb

LPs 
M³ (2000, Metatone Records)
These Open Fields (2001, Alphabasic) (re-released in 2002 as "These Open Fields (Second Edition)")
Girls.Suck.But.YOU.Don't (2003, Accel Muzhik)
Resent and the April Sunshine Shed (2003, Alphabasic)
Red Extensions of Me (2004, Bohnerwachs Tontraeger)
Kirlian Selections (2005, Sublight)
Réunion (2005, Sublight)
Flexing Habitual (2006, Sublight)
Soundtrack to a Vacant Life (2007, Alphabasic)
Arboreal (2010, Alphabasic)
Love as a Dark Hallway (2011, Alphabasic)
Opus at the End of Everything (2012, Alphabasic)
Hardscrabble (2012, Alphabasic)
Nothing is Real (2014, Alphabasic)
Solar One (2014, Alphabasic)
Compositions for Piano (2015, Alphabasic)
Piety Of Ashes (2017, Alphabasic)
Dormant (Movement 1 Through 7) (2018, Alphabasic)
Our Simulacra (2020, Alphabasic)
Seven Quarantine Poems (2021, Alphabasic)

EPs 
Sleep Radio (1998, Suburban Trash)
Ephedrine EP (1999, Metatone Records)
Fly! (2001, Metatone Records)
Drain Mode = ON (2001, Bohnerwachs Tontraeger)
Lawn Funeral EP (2003, Sublight)
Binedump EP (2005, Bohnerwachs Tontraeger)
That Missing Week EP (December 8, 2007, Alphabasic)
Terra Firma EP (December 14, 2011, Alphabasic)
aBliss (May 27, 2015, Alphabasic)

As Benn Jordan 
 Digital Sex (1996) (LP)
 Sleep (1997) (EP)
 Phoenix² (1998) (LP)
 The Best Of Benn L. Jordan Volume 2 (1999, Metatone Records)
 The Nail (Original Motion Picture Score) (2006, Alphabasic) (EP)
 Pale Blue Dot (2008, Alphabasic) (LP)
 Louisiana Mourning (September 1, 2009, Alphabasic) (EP)
 Old Trees (1999–2011) (2011, Alphabasic) (compilation)
 The Universe Original Score (July 9, 2012, Alphabasic) (EP)
 Cosmic Wonder (Original Motion Picture Score) (May 17, 2013, Alphabasic) (LP)

As other aliases 
 66x – Diffusion (1994)
 66x – 40,000 Whores (1995)
 66x – The Art of Killing Pain (1996)
 66x – An Opening (1996)
 DJ ASCII – Untitled (1999)
 Lucid32 – Lucid32 (1999)
 Dysrythmia – Clone EP (1999)
 Dysrythmia – The Puncture (2000)
 CHR15TPUNCH3R – Sielle (2000, Alphabasic)
 Q-Bit – I Love Anna Log (2000, Alphabasic) (EP)
 FlexE – Programmable Love Songs Vol. 1 (2004, Nophi) (LP)
 Acidwolf – Legacy 1995–2005 (2005, Dirty Dancing Recordings, Alphabasic) (LP)
 Dr. Lefty – Get Mad Now EP (2006, Reject Records) (EP)
 Human Action Network – Welcome to Chicago (The Acid Anthology) (2007, Alphabasic) (LP)

Singles 
"Me Touching Dead Air" (2000, Radio York, UK)
"Machine Drum – Late Night Operation (Benn Jordan Mix)" (2009, digital download)
"Vague Detroit (UAS 303 Remix)" (2009, Digital Download) as Human Action Network
"A Raw Understanding" (February 26, 2010, Alphabasic) as The Flashbulb

As featured artist 
Bogdan Raczynski – Untitled 7" – (2002, Rephlex) "Fnck You Dj" (remixed by the Flashbulb w/ Nautilis)
 Various Artists – Big System Morsels (2004, 2playermusic) – "Parkways" as Benn L. Jordan and "Everyday Blue" as The Flashbulb
 Various Artists – The Sound of One Constant Pitch (2004, Nophi) – "Lawn Wake V (featuring Admiral T)" as The Flashbulb
 Various Artists – We Are The Music Makers | Volume One  (2004, WATMM Records) – "She's Moving Along Right Now But I'm Not Going To Be Dramatic" as The Flashbulb
 The Red Moon Big Band – Love At Orange (2004, Maestro-Matic) (LP) (collaboration – credited as Benn Jordan for synthesizer and samples)
 Machine Drum – Mergerz & Acquisitionz (2006, Merck) – "Cherokee Lectro Mix" (by Acidwolf)
 Various Artists – 030303 (2006, Marguerita Recordings) – "Blue Morning Drive" as Acidwolf
 Various Artists – Do:Nation Volume 1 – A Compilation for the Animal Charities of America (2006, Nophi) – "Ant IDM" as The Flashbulb
 Various Artists – Eyelicker (2006, Sublight) – Hometown UFO as The Flashbulb
 Various Artists – 30 Days (2006, Peppermill Records) – "Smoking Blue Midi" as The Flashbulb
 Various Artists – Imaginary Friends (2007, Sublight) – "Our Furry Past Life" as The Flashbulb
 Digita'lis/Phlox – The Drummondii Days (2007, GOZombie Records) – "A Shape of Strange Faith" (The Flashbulb Remix)
 Bartel – Bartel (2009, Alphabasic) – "White Grade" (remixed by The Flashbulb)
 Various Artists – GOZOMBIE Growing Compilation (2010, GOZombie Records) – "Zeke Acid" as The Flashbulb

References

External links 

 

1978 births
Living people
Intelligent dance musicians
American electronic musicians
Musicians from Chicago